Bârzava can refer to the following places in Romania:

 Bârzava (Timiș),  a tributary of the Timiș
 Bârzava (Mureș), a tributary of the Mureș
 Bârzava, Arad, a commune in Arad County
 Bârzava, a village in Frumoasa commune, Harghita County

See also 
 Bârzăvița River (disambiguation)